Chiranjib Biswal is a  politician belonging to the  Indian National Congress party from Odisha, currently MLA from the 104- Jagatsinghpur constituency, and deputy opposition leader of the Odisha assembly. He is the elder son of former deputy chief minister of Odisha, the late Basant Kumar Biswal. He has also previously been a member of the legislative assembly from  Tirtol and Jagatsinghpur assembly constituencies and is also the treasurer of the Odisha Pradesh Congress Committee. He has also been the Vice President of OPCC and has served in its various committees. He is also a member of the All India Congress Committee (AICC). He is the elder brother of IPL chairman and Member of Parliament Ranjib Biswal. He is married to Tejal Biswal and has a son named Sadjyot Biswal.

References 

Members of the Odisha Legislative Assembly
Living people
Year of birth missing (living people)
Place of birth missing (living people)
People from Jagatsinghpur district
People from Cuttack
Indian National Congress politicians
Indian National Congress politicians from Odisha